Centotheceae is a small tribe of grasses with six species in two genera, distributed in Africa and Asia. It belongs to a basal lineage in subfamily Panicoideae, sometimes referred to as "centothecoid clade". Unlike many other clades in the subfamily Panicoideae, they use the C3 photosynthetic pathway.

References 

Panicoideae
Poaceae tribes